was a Japanese alpine skier. He competed in the men's combined event at the 1936 Winter Olympics.

References

External links
 

1910 births
Year of death missing
Japanese male alpine skiers
Japanese male Nordic combined skiers
Olympic alpine skiers of Japan
Olympic Nordic combined skiers of Japan
Alpine skiers at the 1936 Winter Olympics
Nordic combined skiers at the 1936 Winter Olympics
Sportspeople from Hokkaido
People from Otaru
20th-century Japanese people